Paul Holahan is an American film, television director, cinematographer, producer and photographer.

Career
He has directed episodes of Witchblade, Numb3rs, Las Vegas, Shark, Ugly Betty, Burn Notice, The Mentalist, Wedding Band, GCB, Castle, Revenge, Body of Proof, Rizzoli and Isles The Man in the High Castle, Fringe and The Blacklist. As well as producing and directing episodes of Without a Trace, The Ex List and Fairly Legal. In 2007, he directed the independent film Hindsight. He directed Body of Proof episode "Hunting Party".

Holahan has also worked as a cinematographer for a number of short films. As well as directing and photographing music videos for country singers Jeffrey Steele and Shana.

References

External links

American film directors
American cinematographers
American music video directors
American photographers
American television directors
American television producers
Living people
Place of birth missing (living people)
Year of birth missing (living people)